The South Camden Trust Company building is located within the South Camden area of Camden, New Jersey and was listed on the state and federal registers of historic places in 1990. Built in the 1920s, it has long functioned as a church.

See also
National Register of Historic Places listings in Camden County, New Jersey

References

National Register of Historic Places in Camden County, New Jersey
Buildings and structures in Camden, New Jersey
New Jersey Register of Historic Places
Bank buildings on the National Register of Historic Places in New Jersey
Neoclassical architecture in New Jersey
Commercial buildings completed in 1926
Historic district contributing properties in New Jersey
1926 establishments in New Jersey